The 2013 Thai FA Cup Final was the 20th final of Thailand's domestic football cup competition, the FA Cup. The final was played at Thammasat Stadium in Pathum Thani on 10 November 2013. The match was contested by Bangkok Glass, who beat Police United 5–2 in their semi-final, and Buriram United who beat Muangthong United 1–0 in the match. After Chatree Chimtalay opened the scoring in 17th minute, Osmar, Carmelo González and Kai Hirano equalised in the 32nd, 53rd and 60th minutes before the draw and Buriram United beat Bangkok Glass 3–1 .

Road to the final

Note: In all results below, the score of the finalist is given first (H: home; A: away; TPL: Clubs from Thai Premier League; D1: Clubs from Thai Division 1 League; D2: Clubs from Regional League Division 2).

Match

Details

Assistant referees:
 Toru Sagara (Japan)
 Toshiyuki Nagi (Japan)
Fourth official:
 Chaiya Mahapab (Thailand)
MATCH RULES
90 minutes.
30 minutes of extra-time if necessary.
Penalty shootout if scores still level.
Nine named substitutes
Maximum of 3 substitutions.

2013
1